The 2018 Liga 3 Riau is a qualifying round for the national round of 2018 Liga 3. Nabil F.C., the winner of the 2017 Liga 3 Riau are the defending champions. The competition will begin on August 12, 2018.

Format 
In this competition, all teams will face each other in home and away match. The winner will represent Riau in next round.

Teams 
There are 8 teams which will participate the league this season.

References 

2018 in Indonesian football
Seasons in Asian third tier association football leagues